In Retrospect is the final comedy album by Nichols and May. It is a "best of" compilation album of their first three albums.

Track listing
Telephone - 8:13	
Adultery - 7:52	
Disc Jockey - 9:06	
Mother and Son - 6:33	
A Little More Gauze - 3:34	
Morning Rounds - 1:42	
Merry Christmas, Doctor - 3:43	
Physical - 5:11	
Cocktail Piano - 4:41	
Bach to Bach - 5:31	
Second Piano Concerto (The Dentist) - 5:02	
Nichols and May at Work - 4:30

References

1962 compilation albums
Nichols and May albums
Mercury Records albums
1960s comedy albums
1960s spoken word albums